The 2016 Navy Midshipmen football team represented the United States Naval Academy in the 2016 NCAA Division I FBS football season. The Midshipmen were led by ninth-year head coach Ken Niumatalolo and played their home games at Navy–Marine Corps Memorial Stadium. The Midshipmen competed as a member of the West Division of the American Athletic Conference, and were second year members of the conference. They finished the season 9–5 overall and 7–1 in American Athletic play to be champions of the West Division. They represented the West Division in The American Athletic Championship Game where they lost to Temple. They were invited to the Armed Forces Bowl where they lost to Louisiana Tech.

Before the season

Previous season
The Navy Midshipmen began the 2015 season with four straight wins, including a win over military rival Air Force, but lost to rival #15 ranked Notre Dame. However, the Midshipmen continued their winning ways with five consecutive victories, including fellow American Conference team #15 ranked Memphis. After falling to conference rival #21 ranked Houston, Navy ended their season with a victory over military rival Army in the 116th Army–Navy Game, their 14th consecutive victory over Army, earning the Commander-in-Chief's Trophy. The Midshipmen finished the regular season with a 10–2 record. This earned the Midshipmen an invitation to the Military Bowl, their 12th bowl game in a row, in which they beat the 8–5 Pittsburgh Panthers 44–28.

Spring practices
Navy held spring practices during March and April 2016.

Schedule

Note: ‡ Game at East Carolina was originally scheduled for Thursday, October 13, but was postponed due to flooding from Hurricane Matthew; it was rescheduled to Saturday, November 19.

Personnel

Coaching staff

Roster

Depth chart

Depth Chart 2016
True Freshman
Double Position : *

Rankings

Game summaries

Fordham

UConn

at Tulane

at Air Force

Houston

This game marked Navy Midshipmen's biggest upset victory facing a top-10 ranked opponent in 32 years. (Since 1984 as they won against #2 ranked South Carolina) The game marked Ken Niumatalolo's 4th win over a ranked team.

Memphis

With this victory, Navy has 14th straight home wins, making it the 3rd longest active streak in FBS history. Also their longest at Navy-Marine Stadium since it opened in 1959. Personal player highlights include: wide receiver Jamir Tillman became the 2nd all-time receiver in Naval Academy history with 1,281 career receiving yards, passing Phil McConkey. And quarterback Will Worth had career highs with 201 rushing yards (286 total yards) and 5 touchdowns.

at South Florida

vs. Notre Dame

With this rare victory, Navy beat Notre Dame for only the 4th time in 52 years (1963) in the nation's longest-running intersectional rivalry since 1926 (the 90th year). The Fighting Irish previously won five in a row against the Midshipmen. Navy coach Ken Niumatalolo got this 3rd win over Notre Dame, tying former Navy coach Wayne Hardin from the 1960s, and handing the Fighting Irish their 14th losing season ever. Navy quarterback Will Worth ran for 175 yards with two touchdowns, making it his 9th consecutive game with a rushing score. Worth finished with his 4th straight 100-yard rushing performance (his 5th of the season).

Tulsa

After this win, Navy has 15 straight home victories, making it the second longest winning streak in the FBS. Navy also has the winningest Senior Class in Naval Academy history with 36–13, tying the all-time program record with the class of 1909 (36–7–5) and the class of 2016 (36–16). And 14 straight Senior Day victories. The Midshipmen stand alone in the Western Division in the American Conference. Personal highlights include Navy wide receiver Jamir Tillman who moved to second place on Navy's career receiving yards leaders list with 1,454 catches, passing Phil McConkey with 1,278 catches.

at East Carolina

With this win, Navy clinched the AAC West division title, and will move on to the AAC championship game in only their second year in the conference. They also set some school record season highs; highest point total (66), most rushing touchdowns (9), and rushing yards (456). Personal highlights include Navy quarterback Will Worth becoming just the 5th player in school history with 1,000+ rushing and passing yards in a season. And six straight 100 yard games, ten with a rushing touchdown, which is the longest active streak in the FBS. Worth is tied with Jeremy McNichols from Boise State with 22 rushing touchdowns.

at SMU

Temple

 This game marked the first game, after 136 years of being independent, that Navy was in a conference championship.

vs. Army

Louisiana Tech (Armed Forces Bowl)

References

Navy
Navy Midshipmen football seasons
Navy Midshipmen football